Gregory Fishbeck Knapp (March 5, 1963 – July 22, 2021) was an American professional football coach in the National Football League (NFL). He served as an assistant coach for 25 seasons with the New York Jets, Atlanta Falcons, Denver Broncos, Oakland Raiders, Houston Texans, Seattle Seahawks and San Francisco 49ers. He played college football and later coached at California State University, Sacramento.

Playing career
As a quarterback at Sacramento State University, Knapp enjoyed a distinguished career where he ranked among the Hornets' career leaders with more than 3,800 passing yards and 32 touchdown passes. He went to training camps with the Kansas City Chiefs in 1986, Los Angeles Raiders from 1987 to 1990, and the San Francisco 49ers in 1992 to 1994. Prior to joining the 49ers as a coach, Knapp spent nine years on the coaching staff of Sacramento State, as running backs coach from 1986–1989, receivers coach from 1989–1990, and offensive coordinator/assistant head coach from 1991–1994. Knapp's coaching career at Sacramento State included the 1988 season where Sacramento State reached the semifinals of the NCAA Division II Football Championship.

Coaching career

San Francisco 49ers
Knapp spent nine years in various positions with the San Francisco 49ers: offensive quality control from 1995 to 1997, quarterbacks coach from 1998 to 2000, and offensive coordinator from 2001 to 2003, featuring the West coast offense.

Atlanta Falcons
Knapp was named offensive coordinator for the Atlanta Falcons from 2004 to 2006, helping to form Michael Vick at quarterback as a potent two-way offensive threat. The 2004 Atlanta Falcons finished first in the NFC South with an 11-5 record.

Oakland Raiders
Knapp then went to the Oakland Raiders as offensive coordinator in 2007 and 2008.

Seattle Seahawks
In 2009, Knapp was hired by the Seattle Seahawks as offensive coordinator.

Houston Texans
Knapp was the quarterbacks coach of the Houston Texans from 2010 to 2011, helping mold Matt Schaub into a premier quarterback. The 2011 Texans finished the season 10–6 and first place in the AFC South.

Oakland Raiders (second stint)
Before the start of the 2012 NFL season, he was named by new head coach Dennis Allen, whom he met as a fellow coach in Atlanta, as offensive coordinator of the Raiders a second time around. To strengthen the offensive line, the Raiders' general manager, Reggie McKenzie, picked the Texans' right guard, Mike Brisiel, as a free agent. After a season marked by a switch to a zone-blocking scheme at Knapp's urging, and the resulting ineffectiveness of the Raiders' key offensive threat, running back Darren McFadden, Knapp was relieved of his duties as the Raiders offensive coordinator on December 31, 2012.

Denver Broncos
Knapp was hired as the quarterbacks coach for the Denver Broncos on January 18, 2013.

On February 7, 2016, Knapp was part of the Broncos coaching staff that won Super Bowl 50. In the game, the Broncos defeated the Carolina Panthers by a score of 24–10.

After Vance Joseph was hired as head coach for the Broncos, he and Knapp parted ways.

Atlanta Falcons (second stint)
On January 22, 2018, Knapp returned to the Atlanta Falcons as their quarterbacks coach.

New York Jets
On January 18, 2021, Knapp was hired by the New York Jets as their quarterbacks coach under head coach Robert Saleh.

Personal life and death

On July 17, 2021, Knapp was struck by a motorist while riding his bicycle in San Ramon, California, near his home. He died from his injuries five days later in a hospital in Walnut Creek, California at the age of 58.

Knapp is survived by his daughter, Jordan, wife, Charlotte, and two stepdaughters, Natalie and Camille. At the time of his death, he lived in Danville, California.

References

External links
 Atlanta Falcons profile

1963 births
2021 deaths
American football quarterbacks
Atlanta Falcons coaches
Cycling road incident deaths
Houston Texans coaches
Kansas City Chiefs players
Los Angeles Raiders players
National Football League offensive coordinators
Oakland Raiders coaches
People from Danville, California
People from Seal Beach, California
Players of American football from Long Beach, California
Road incident deaths in California
Sacramento State Hornets football coaches
Sacramento State Hornets football players
San Francisco 49ers coaches
San Francisco 49ers players
Seattle Seahawks coaches
Sportspeople from Long Beach, California
Sportspeople from Orange County, California